was a Japanese conductor.

Person 
Asahina was born in Tokyo as an illegitimate child of Kaichi Watanabe. He founded the Kansai Symphonic Orchestra (today the Osaka Philharmonic Orchestra) in 1947 and remained its chief conductor until his death in Kobe.  Inspired by a meeting with Wilhelm Furtwängler in the 1950s, he began a lifelong attachment to the music of Anton Bruckner, recording the complete Bruckner symphonies several times.  For many years, he was associated with the North German Radio Orchestra in Hamburg. In May and October 1996, he appeared with the Chicago Symphony Orchestra.

Awards and honors 
 Asahi Prize  
 Medal with Purple Ribbon  
 Order of the Rising Sun, 3rd class  
 Person of Cultural Merit  
 Order of Culture  
 Officers Crosses of the Order of Merit of the Federal Republic of Germany  
 Cross of Honour for Science and Art, First Class

External links
Obituary
Tribute to Maestro Takashi Asahina
Asteroid 5230 named in his honor

References

1908 births
2001 deaths
20th-century conductors (music)
20th-century Japanese male musicians
Japanese conductors (music)
Japanese male conductors (music)
Kyoto University alumni
Officers Crosses of the Order of Merit of the Federal Republic of Germany
Musicians from Tokyo
Recipients of the Austrian Cross of Honour for Science and Art, 1st class
Recipients of the Order of Culture
Recipients of the Order of the Rising Sun, 3rd class